Ratha's Challenge is the fourth book in The Books of the Named series of young adult prehistoric fiction novels by Clare Bell.

As Ratha struggles to reconcile with Thistle-chaser, the daughter she once tried to kill, the Named are locked in another struggle when they confront a strange clan of highly sapient Dinaelurus called the Face-Tail Hunter Tribe (so named for their capability of bringing down mammutids called Face-Tails) who are driven by and completely dependent on the telepathic song of their leader, True-of-voice. When an accident leaves True-of-voice on the brink of death, Ratha must choose whether to destroy or to save the hunters. It is her daughter who has the knowledge to show Ratha the way... if she can listen. 

1994 American novels
American young adult novels
Young adult fantasy novels
American fantasy novels
Children's novels about animals
Novels set in prehistory
Margaret K. McElderry books